The Sandow Athletic Club was a sports club in the Philippines.

Established in 1906, the football team participated in the first official match in the Philippines on October 15, 1906 in celebration of the opening of the Philippine Assembly. Sandow was awarded a trophy, a silver cup by then Governor William Howard Taft for winning the contest. The football team then became the Sandow Athletic Club in 1909 and began to accommodate other sports.

References

Football clubs in the Philippines
Association football clubs established in 1906
Sports teams in Metro Manila
1906 establishments in the Philippines